KSUB (590 AM) is a radio station broadcasting a news/talk format. Licensed to Cedar City, Utah, United States, the station is currently owned by Townsquare Media.

The station is also heard on a translator, K299BU, at 107.7 FM in Cedar City.

History
On September 22, 1936, Harold Johnson and Leland M. Perry received a construction permit for a new 100-watt radio station to operate on 1310 kHz at Cedar City. The station was originally scheduled to open June 17, 1937, but days before opening, the tower collapsed in a construction accident, prompting the opening to be postponed to July 4. Perry took over as sole operator in 1939 when Johnson, a local dry goods store owner, died. A reorganization of KSUB under the Southern Utah Broadcasting Company followed, with Earl L. Glade, general manager of KSL in Salt Lake City, becoming the largest stockholder. The station moved to 1340 kHz in 1941 as part of NARBA reallocation and was authorized in 1944 to increase power to 250 watts.

KSUB's ties to KSL became more concrete in 1944, when the Radio Service Corporation, its licensee, purchased a majority share in the Cedar City outlet. On November 1, the station joined CBS, matching KSL's affiliation. In November 1944, KSUB filed to move to 590 kHz with 1,000 watts, which was initially approved in 1946 but did not receive final approval until 1949. The upgrades included a new transmitter site, with two  towers replacing the  mast in use; the site was separated from the studios and so needed a telephone link and its own night watchman, complete with on-site apartment. KSUB moved to 590 kHz on March 10, 1950.

In 1957, KSL sold majority control in the Southern Utah Broadcasting Company to a group of four investors, who within a year transferred their shares to the Beehive Telecasting Company, which at the time was building an independent television station, KLOR-TV channel 11, in Provo. The television station venture performed poorly, and in late 1959, the station was sold to Granite District Radio Broadcasting Company, which owned Salt Lake City's KNAK.

1976 brought an FM counterpart to KSUB, but not before more pre-construction trouble similar to that which had befallen KSUB itself 39 years prior. While the new tower was being put into place, gusty winds tangled the guy lines in the tower, and corrective efforts led to the tower crashing to the ground. After contending with other issues during construction, KSUB-FM began broadcasting in November 1976.

In 1983, one of the two towers installed in 1949 was toppled in a wind storm, being replaced later that year. In 1984, KSUB flipped from adult contemporary to country in a switch with KSUB-FM. It would retain that format until a brief flip to adult standards in 1988 that did not last the year.

In 1991, KSUB began its move to its present news/talk format when it picked up The Rush Limbaugh Show. It was a decision that came at a crucial time for the station, which was struggling financially. More than 35 years of ownership by members of the Johnson family ended in 2005 when KSUB and its four sister stations were sold to Cherry Creek Radio for $5.8 million, marking the group's entrance into the southwestern Utah radio market.

KSUB returned to being the flagship station of Southern Utah Thunderbirds athletics in 2020 as part of a new deal with Cherry Creek.

References

External links

SUB
News and talk radio stations in the United States
Radio stations established in 1937
Talk radio stations in the United States
Cedar City, Utah
Townsquare Media radio stations